Fantails are small insectivorous songbirds of the genus Rhipidura in the family Rhipiduridae, native to Australasia, Southeast Asia and the Indian subcontinent.

The true wagtails are part of the genus Motacilla in the family Motacillidae and are not close relatives of the fantails.

Description

The fantails are small bodied (11.5–21 cm long) birds with long tails; in some species the tail is longer than the body and in most the tail is longer than the wing. When the tail is folded it is rounded at the end, but when spread in display or aerial foraging it has a characteristic fan shape that gives the family its name.

Fantails adopt a hunched horizontal posture most of the time, with the wings drooped and held away from the body and the tail half cocked. There are some exceptions to this, particularly the northern fantail of New Guinea and the Cockerell's fantail of the Solomon Islands, which have a more upright posture reminiscent of the monarch flycatchers.

The wings of fantails are tapered and have sacrificed speed for agility, making fantails highly efficient at catching insect prey. Overall the fantails are strong fliers, and some species can undertake long migrations, but the thicket fantails (sooty thicket fantail, white-bellied thicket fantail and black thicket fantail) are very weak fliers, and need to alight regularly.

The bills of fantails are typical for aerial insect eating birds, being flat and triangular. The gape is surrounded by two rows of rictal bristles which are long, often as long as the bill. The bills of most species are fairly weak, limiting fantails to softer insects, although the more terrestrial willie wagtail has a stronger bill.

The plumage of most fantails shows some variation, most species are relatively uniform with some markings. A few species, such as the Rennell fantail, have uniform plumage, while others have striking if sombre patterns. The colours of most species are greys, blacks, whites and browns, although a few species  have yellow or even striking blue feathers. In most species there is no sexual dimorphism in plumage; the notable exception being the black fantail of New Guinea where the male has all-over black plumage and the female is almost entirely rufous. In a few species, such as the New Zealand fantail, there exist two colour morphs, the common pied morph and the rarer black morph (which is most common in the South Island).

Distribution and habitat

Fantails are an Australasian family that has spread from as far as Samoa to northern India. In the south the grey fantail ranges as far as The Snares off New Zealand, in the eastern extent of the family has several endemic forms in western Polynesia. There are numerous species in Indonesia, the Philippines and in South East Asia, and the family ranges into southern China, India and the Himalayas. Some species have a widespread distribution, particularly the willie wagtail, grey fantail, white-throated fantail and northern fantail; others have a highly restricted range and in the case of some insular species may be restricted to a single island. The Mussau fantail is restricted to a single island in the Bismarck Archipelago, and the Kadavu fantail has a similarly restricted distribution in the Kadavu Group of Fiji.

Most fantails, particularly the tropical or insular forms, are sedentary and undertake no migration. Some northern and southern species undertake a variety of movements; the yellow-bellied fantail of the Himalayas is an altitudinal migrant, breeding between 1500 and 4000 metres, but moving to lower altitudes (as low as 180 m) in the winter. Some Australian fantails undertake seasonal migrations, although these show considerable variation even within individual species. Most populations of the rufous fantail exhibit little migratory behaviour, but the south-eastern population moves en masse to northern Queensland and New Guinea.   

Fantails exhibit wide tastes in habitat; while the majority of species are found in rainforests fantails exist in most available habitats from deserts and mangrove forests to highly modified agricultural and urban environments. Most species are able to survive in a variety of habitats. Of all the species the mangrove fantail has the most restricted habitat requirements, being entirely restricted to mangrove forests over some of its range, although it can exist 3 km away in the absence of other fantails. Some of the more primitive species are generally more restricted to primary rainforest, but most other species can survive in more disturbed forest. The most adaptable species is the willie wagtail, which is abundant in every habitat type in Australia except for dense rainforest.

Behaviour and ecology
The behaviour of many species of fantail has not been studied, but overall the family is highly uniform in its habits. Anecdotal observations of less studied species suggest a high degree of similarity with the better studied species. Fantails are highly active birds, with several of the smaller species continuously on the move; even when perched they continue to rock back and forth, spin 180° on the spot, wag their tail from side to side or fan it. In flight they are highly agile and undertake highly aerobatic and intricate looping flights while using their fanned tail to catch insects in flight.

Diet and foraging

The majority of the diet of fantails composes of small insects and invertebrates. The larger willie wagtail is capable of tackling small skinks, but this is exceptional. Insect prey is generally small and easily handled, but larger items sometimes need to be subdued by being banged on branches, an action that also removes the wings of larger prey items like moths.

There are two general techniques used by the family in order to obtain prey. The first is known as "static searching", where the fantail will remain at a perch and watch for aerial prey which it will then sally towards and snatch from the air before returning to the perch in order to consume and resume searching. The second method used is known as "progressive searching", where the fantail moves through vegetation searching for insect prey which it gleans; the movement of the searching fantail also flushes out hidden prey which is also pursued and consumed. The willie wagtail performs a terrestrial version of this technique, pumping its tail from side to side and undertaking quick darting movements across open ground in order to flush out prey.

Fantails frequently form associations with other species in order obtain prey. Some species perch on the backs of cattle, which they use both as a vantage point and because the cattle flush up insects. This behaviour has given the willie wagtail the nickname "shepherd's companion". Fantails are often very bold around people and will approach them closely in order to capture insects flushed by them. Different species are also frequently found in mixed-species feeding flocks, travelling with other small insectivorous birds on the periphery of the flocks taking advantage of flushed prey.

Breeding

Fantails are territorial and aggressively defend their territories from conspecifics (other members of the same species) as well as other fantail species and other flycatchers. Within the territory the female selects the nesting site, these sites are often close to the previous year's nest. Breeding responsibilities, nest building, incubation and chick feeding, are shared between both sexes.

The nest, a small cup of grass stems neatly bound together in spider silk, takes around 10 days to construct. Many species incorporate a trailing tail into the base of the nest; this possibly breaks up the shape of the nest, although little other effort is made to conceal the nest. To compensate for the high visibility of the nest fantails will aggressively defend their chicks from potential predators.

Female fantails will also distract a potential predator by appearing to be injured and luring the predator away from the nest. While the female is pretending to be injured the male may continue to attack the predator. In spite of this fantails have a generally low nesting success.

Species
Based on the IOC's listing as of June 2021:
Mindanao blue fantail, Rhipidura superciliaris
Visayan blue fantail, Rhipidura samarensis
Blue-headed fantail, Rhipidura cyaniceps
Tablas fantail, Rhipidura sauli
Visayan fantail, Rhipidura albiventris
Chestnut-bellied fantail, Rhipidura hyperythra
Friendly fantail, Rhipidura albolimbata
Grey fantail, Rhipidura albiscapa
New Zealand fantail, Rhipidura fuliginosa
Lord Howe fantail, Rhipidura fuliginosa cervina - extinct (c.1925)
Mangrove fantail, Rhipidura phasiana
Brown fantail, Rhipidura drownei
Makira fantail, Rhipidura tenebrosa
Rennell fantail, Rhipidura rennelliana
Streaked fantail, Rhipidura verreauxi
Kadavu fantail, Rhipidura personata
Samoan fantail, Rhipidura nebulosa
Sulawesi fantail, Rhipidura teysmanni
Taliabu fantail, Rhipidura sulaensis
Tawny-backed fantail, Rhipidura superflua
Streak-breasted fantail, Rhipidura dedemi
Long-tailed fantail, Rhipidura opistherythra
Palau fantail, Rhipidura lepida
Rufous-backed fantail, Rhipidura rufidorsa
Bismarck fantail, Rhipidura dahli
Mussau fantail, Rhipidura matthiae
Malaita fantail, Rhipidura malaitae
Arafura fantail, Rhipidura dryas
Pohnpei fantail, Rhipidura kubaryi
Rufous fantail, Rhipidura rufifrons
Guam rufous fantail, Rhipidura rufifrons uraniae - extinct (1984)
Manus fantail, Rhipidura semirubra
Dimorphic fantail, Rhipidura brachyrhyncha
Black fantail, Rhipidura atra
Black-and-cinnamon fantail, Rhipidura nigrocinnamomea
Rufous-tailed fantail, Rhipidura phoenicura
White-bellied fantail, Rhipidura euryura

Spotted fantail, Rhipidura perlata
White-browed fantail, Rhipidura aureola
Malaysian pied fantail, Rhipidura javanica
Philippine pied fantail, Rhipidura nigritorquis
White-throated fantail, Rhipidura albicollis
White-spotted fantail, Rhipidura albogularis
Brown-capped fantail, Rhipidura diluta
Cinnamon-tailed fantail, Rhipidura fuscorufa
Northern fantail, Rhipidura rufiventris
Biak fantail, Rhipidura kordensis
Cockerell's fantail or white-winged fantail, Rhipidura cockerelli
Sooty thicket fantail, Rhipidura threnothorax
White-bellied thicket fantail, Rhipidura leucothorax
Black thicket fantail, Rhipidura maculipectus
Willie wagtail, Rhipidura leucophrys
Peleng fantail, Rhipidura habibiei

Former species
Formerly, some authorities also considered the following species (or subspecies) as species within the genus Rhipidura:
Slaty monarch (as Rhipidura Lessoni)
Yellow-bellied fantail (as Rhipidura hypoxantha) – recognized in 2009 as a fairy-flycatcher of family Stenostiridae and has been moved to its old genus Chelidorhynx.
Rhipidura fallax (as ''Rhipidura fallax)

References

External links

Videos, photos and sounds - Internet Bird Collection

 
Taxa named by Nicholas Aylward Vigors
Taxa named by Thomas Horsfield